The United States Air Force's 148th Space Operations Squadron (148 SOPS) is a satellite control unit located at Vandenberg AFB, California. The 148th SOPS is tasked with back-up command and control of the MILSTAR satellite constellation.

Mission
The 148 SOPS mans the Primary Satellite Operations Center-Vandenberg (PSOC-V), one of two fixed Milstar Ground Stations. Unique to Milstar is its ground segment for control of the constellation.  Milstar has two fixed ground stations, Primary Satellite Operations Center (PSOC), at 4 SOPS and Primary Satellite Operations Center – Vandenberg or PSOC-V. Each site is fully capable of complete constellation control and operates 24/7. The Milstar Ops Center-Vandenberg is operated by the 148 SOPS, a California Air Guard Unit, and does control 2 Milstar satellites full-time.

History
The 148 SOPS was originally established as the 148th Combat Communications Squadron at Compton, California.  The unit was redesignated the 148th Space Operations Squadron and relocated to Vandenberg AFB, California on 31 October 2000.

Previous designations
 148th Space Operations Squadron (2000–present)
 148th Combat Communications Squadron (1976–2000)
 148th Mobil Communications Squadron (1960–1976)
 148th Aircraft Control and Warning Squadron (1948–1960)

Locations
 Vandenberg SFB, California (2000–present)
 March ARB, California (1997–2000)
 Ontario ANGS, California (1984–1997)
 Compton, California (1948–1951) as the 148th Aircraft Control and Warming Squadron. 
 Oklahoma Air Force Station, OK (1 May 1951 – 31 January 1953) Oklahoma Air Force Station, OK. 
 Compton ANG Station, CA (1953–1960) as 148th Aircraft Control and Warning Squadron. 
 Compton ANGB, CA (1960–1976) as the 148th Mobil Communications Squadron. 
 Compton ANGB, CA (1976–1984) as 148th Combat Communications Squadron. 
 Ontario ANGB, CA ( 1984–1997) as 148th Combat Communications Squadron. 
Title: 50th Anniversary-History of 148th Combat Comm Squadron.

Decorations

See also
4th Space Operations Squadron – Active Duty Counterpart to 148 SOPS
MILSTAR – Military Strategic and Tactical Relay satellite

References

External links

Squadrons of the United States Air National Guard
Space Operations 0148
Military units and formations in California